In the context of surgery or dental surgery, a gag is a device used to hold the patient's mouth open when working in the oral cavity, or to force the mouth open when it cannot open naturally because of forward dislocation of the jaw joint's intraarticular cartilage pad. Applications for medical gags include oral surgery and airway management. Gag designs, like other medical instrument designs, are often named after their inventors. Common examples of medical gags include the Jennings, Whitehead, and Hallam gags.

Types

Whitehead gag: invented in 1877 by Walter Whitehead (1840-1913), a surgeon in Manchester, England, consists of two hinged metal frames that wrap around the front of the patient's head and which have sections bent to fit between the front teeth. When spread apart, the frames separate the jaws, holding the mouth open. The desired degree of separation is set and maintained by a ratchet mechanism on each side of the frame.
Jennings gag: they are very similar, but there is a ratchet on only one side.

Non-medical uses
These type of gags are also used in sexual fetish or bondage play.  See Gag (BDSM)#Medical.

See also
 Medical device
 Mouth prop
Instruments used in general surgery

References

External links
 Mouth gags index page from the Virtual Museum of Equipment for Airway Management at the Austrian Difficult Airway/Intubation Registry

Surgical instruments